The Canadian 5K Road Race Championships is the annual national championships for the 5km road race in Canada. The inaugural event will be held on September 7, 2014. The event is currently part of the B&O Yorkville Run in Yorkville, Toronto.

National athletics competitions
Road running in Canada
Recurring sporting events established in 2014
Annual sporting events in Canada
2014 establishments in Canada